11th SDFCS Awards 
2006

Best Film: 
 Letters from Iwo Jima 
The 11th San Diego Film Critics Awards, honoring the best in film for 2006, were given in 2006 by the San Diego Film Critics Society.

Clint Eastwood's war drama Letters from Iwo Jima won the awards for Best Film and Best Director. Japanese actor Ken Takakura won the award for Best Actor for his role in Riding Alone for Thousands of Miles. The film also won the awards for Best Foreign Language Film. Helen Mirren won for her role as Queen Elizabeth II in The Queen.

Winners
Best Actor: 
Ken Takakura - Riding Alone for Thousands of Miles (Qian li zou dan qi)
Best Actress: 
Helen Mirren - The Queen
Best Cast:
Babel
Best Cinematography:
The Illusionist - Dick Pope
Best Director: 
Clint Eastwood - Letters from Iwo Jima
Best Editing:
United 93 - Clare Douglas, Richard Pearson, and Christopher Rouse
Best Film: 
Letters from Iwo Jima
Best Foreign Language Film: 
Riding Alone for Thousands of Miles (Qian li zou dan qi) • Hong Kong/China/Japan
Best Non-Fiction Film:
Shut Up & Sing
Best Production Design:
V for Vendetta - Owen Paterson
Best Score:
"Babel" - Gustavo Santaolalla
Best Screenplay - Adapted: 
Thank You for Smoking - Jason Reitman
Best Screenplay - Original:
The Dead Girl - Karen Moncrieff
Best Supporting Actor: 
Ray Winstone - The Proposition
Best Supporting Actress: 
Lili Taylor - Factotum

References

2
2006 film awards
2006 in American cinema